Barvish Kani, also rendered as Berveshkani, may refer to:
 Barvish Kani, Alut
 Barvish Kani, Nanur